Nick Bantock (born 14 July 1949) is a British artist and author based in Saltspring Island, British Columbia, known for his series, The Griffin and Sabine Trilogy.  His books are published by Raincoast Books in Canada and Chronicle Books in the United States, and are known for their elaborate designs featuring faux postage stamps, handwritten documents, passports, postcards and other ephemera.

Career
Bantock attended schools in the northeast suburbs of London, and later an art college in Maidstone, Kent. He began a career as a freelance artist at the age of 23, producing 300 book covers in the ensuing 16 years. In 1988 he moved to Vancouver, and soon after to the nearby Bowen Island, where he had the idea that became the Griffin and Sabine series.

In 1993, he won the Bill Duthie Bookseller's Choice Award for Sabine's Notebook.

In 2006, he adapted the Griffin and Sabine series into a play, also called "Griffin and Sabine", which premiered in Vancouver at the Granville Island Stage and ran from 5 October – 4 November 2006.

In 2007, he resumed painting full-time, and opened a studio-gallery, 'The Forgetting Room', on Saltspring Island.  Between 2007 and 2010, Bantock was one of the twelve committee members responsible for selecting Canada's postage stamps.

Bibliography
 The Griffin and Sabine Saga
 The Griffin and Sabine Trilogy
 Griffin and Sabine: An Extraordinary Correspondence (1991)
 Sabine's Notebook: In Which the Extraordinary Correspondence of Griffin and Sabine Continues (1992)
 The Golden Mean: In Which the Extraordinary Correspondence of Griffin and Sabine Concludes (1993)
 The Morning Star Trilogy
 The Gryphon: In Which the Extraordinary Correspondence of Griffin and Sabine is Rediscovered (2001)
 Alexandria: In Which the Extraordinary Correspondence of Griffin and Sabine Unfolds (2002)
 The Morning Star: In Which the Extraordinary Correspondence of Griffin and Sabine is Illuminated (2003)
 The Pharos Gate: Griffin and Sabine's Lost Correspondence (2016)
 The Missing Nose Flute and Other Mysteries of Life (1991) - postcard book
 The Egyptian Jukebox (1993)
 Averse to Beasts (1994)
 The Venetian's Wife (1996)
 Paris Out of Hand (1996) - with Karen Elizabeth Gordon and Barbara Hodgson
 Capolan ArtBox (1997)
 The Forgetting Room (1997)
 The Museum at Purgatory (1999)
 The Artful Dodger: Images and Reflections (2000) - a visual autobiography, and retrospective
 Urgent 2nd Class: Creating Curious Collage, Dubious Documents, and Other Art from Ephemera (2004)
 Windflower (2006) - with Edoardo Ponti
 The Canterbury Tales (2010) - illustrations only, retold by Peter Ackroyd
 The Trickster's Hat: A Mischievous Apprenticeship in Creativity (2014)
 Dubious Documents (2018)
 The Archeo: Personal Archetype Cards (2021)

Popup books
 There Was An Old Lady (1990)
 Wings (1990)
 Jabberwocky (1991)
 Runners, Sliders, Bouncers, Climbers (1992)
 Solomon Grundy (1992)
 The Walrus and the Carpenter (1992)
 Kubla Khan (1993)
 Robin Hood (1993)
 My Foolish Heart: A Pop-Up Book of Love (2017)

References

External links
NickBantock.com - Official site
Interview with Nick Bantock at January Magazine
Museo 5 - Nick Bantock
Nick Bantock Podcasts Windflower
Nick Bantock Appreciation group on Facebook
 The Venetian for iPad
 The Complete Book Catalog

Living people
English illustrators
20th-century English novelists
21st-century English novelists
1949 births
English male novelists
20th-century English male writers
21st-century English male writers